Heteroglenea dolosa is a species of beetle in the family Cerambycidae. It was described by Lin and Yang in 2009. It is known from Laos.

References

Saperdini
Beetles described in 2009